Bukit Dinding is a forested hill with published height of 291m in Kuala Lumpur sitting in between Setiawangsa and Wangsa Maju. 
According to Google Earth (2022), however, the height of Bukit Dinding is recorded as 302m.
 
"Bukit Dinding" in Malay language means "The Wall Hill" - referring to its steep, extreme gradients. The hill also behaves as a "wall" separating 2 suburbs of Wangsa Maju and Setiawangsa. For the locals, this hill is often described as the last remaining green lung between these highly dense suburbs. The hill has close proximity to Highland Tower and Bukit Antarabangsa, which are parts of the main Titiwangsa Range – infamous for their beauty as well as their notorious landslides.

Geology 
The geological formation of Bukit Dinding was mapped as the oldest formation of the Kuala Lumpur area. This formation is called the "Dinding Schist" – is estimated to be 3400m thick, and consists of quartz-mica schist and quartzite with subsidiary actinolite, diopside and epidote schist and schistose conglomerate (Gobbett, 1965). In other words, it means coarse grained metamorphic rock which consists of layers of different minerals and can be split into thin irregular plates – and that's what makes it unstable.

Flora and fauna 
The forest consists of both Primary and Secondary vegetation. Being previously part of the Hawthornden Rubber Estate, there are many old rubber trees and their saplings, Acacia, Atrocarpus species (Sukun and Terap), Leucaena species and Alstonia augustifolia (Pulai). The Primary vegetation has yet to be studied and revealed.

The Black Bat Flower is indigenous in Bukit Dinding. It is a species known to be very rare in the wild and it cannot be cultivated easily because it can survive only under specific environmental conditions. Black bat flower is listed as endangered plant in many countries.

There are many species of snakes, lizards, civet cats, monkeys and wild boars among the animals that inhabit Bukit Dinding.

Activities and attractions

Downhill cycling 
Bukit Dinding has become popular among cyclists for its steep drops. The tarmac pathway built for the Telekom Tower is a convenience, enabling shuttled service of bicycles to the peak. At least 5 loops of forest trails have been made by volunteer cycling groups.  

Popular event: Bukit Dinding Downhill (BDDH) Race by Scarfox

On 24–25 February 2018, Bukit Dinding Race 2.0 by Scarfox had attracted over 210 participations from 8 countries including America, France, Singapore and Vietnam. 

Within three years, their event participation had increased by twofold. 

BDDH 1.0 was held on 25-26 December 2015

BDDH 2.0 was held on 24-25 February 2018 

BDDH 3.0 was held on 2–3 March 2019

BDDH 4.0 was held on 6–8 March 2020

BDDH 5.0 is to be held on 4-5 March 2023 (upcoming event)

Hiking / trail running / jungle trekking 
Hikers and trail runners are daily visitors of Bukit Dinding. The number of hikers increased during the Malaysia Movement Control Order (MCO) in 2021. The hill is the only open space getaway and workout opportunity for residents nearby. Using the main trek, every loop would be a good 5KM walk ascending and descending the hill. Those with intentions to train for tougher climb such as Mount Kinabalu, also use Bukit Dinding as their training ground – it is a common benchmark that if one could complete 3 loops of the main trail, he/she has achieved a good level of fitness – ready for their Kinabalu climb.

Popular event: Bukit Dinding Challenge (BDC)

Bukit Dinding Challenge is an annual tournament where participants would compete through 12-hours endurance running from 6.30am - 6.30pm

BDC 1.0 was held on 8 October 2017

BDC 2.0 was held on 23 December 2018

BDC 3.0 is to be held on 4–5 February 2023 (upcoming event)

Streams of water 
In an interview with Sinar Harian on 20th November 2014, Harun Mohd Amin, president of Pertubuhan Suara Setiawangsa, a local resident association, claimed that until the 1960s, there used to be a waterfall here. It is believed that the waterfall must have been plugged or redirected to drainages and therefore it is no longer found.

At time of writing, however, there are seen only multiple small streams of water around Bukit Dinding. No waterfall was found.

History

1870: A Battle Location of the Klang War (1867-1874) 

In 1870, the surroundings of Bukit Dinding became the location of one of the battles fought in the Klang War / Selangor Civil War between Raja Abdullah, the administrator of the Klang Valley (led by Tengku Kudin and Yap Ah Loy), and Raja Mahadi, the claimant of that position (led by Syed Mashhor and Chong Chong). The full account of the battle in Bukit Dinding area is quoted here: "Mashhor himself made his way to Chong Chong's camp near Batu Ampat, and suggested an immediate counter-attack, before Ah Loy's men could consolidate their position. Chong Chong agreed with the proposal and that night led a force estimated at about 1,000 men towards Ulu Klang. Mashhor is said to have followed him with an equal force, but advancing by a different route. There is actually only one direct line of approach from Ampang to Ulu Klang, that is up the river valley. It seems probable that Mashhor took this course (he had just retreated along it), while Chong Chong made his way round through the present Gonggang and Hawthornden Estates, to the west of Bukit Dinding. In the meantime Hiu Fatt and Tung Khoon had returned to their improvised camp at Ulu Klang. During the night they were woken by sounds of firearms and shouting, and discovered Mashhor's force in front of their position. They immediately gave orders for a direct attack to be made on the enemy. While it was in progress Chong Chong's men came up from the rear, presumably along the north flank of Bukit Dinding and down the valley of the Sungei Gisir. The Capitan China's men were thus trapped between two larger units of the enemy. Fortunately Ah Loy had decided that evening to re-inforce his troops at Ulu Klang, and had sent Chung Piang out to them with 400 men. These arrived in the middle of the conflict, and presumably in the rear of Chong Chong's encircling force. After a long struggle, in which the Capitans' losses amounted to over 40 killed and 100 wounded, Chong Chong was forced to retreat to his stockade at Ampang, "after sustaining a heavy loss".."

1883: The Gonggang Mines 

In 1883, tin mining activities flourished in a place called "Gonggang" located southwest of Bukit Dinding (around Jalan Jelatek - Kampung Datok Keramat - Setiawangsa area today). The mining areas expanded until further upstream of Sungai Bunus (around Wangsa Maju area today). This was conveyed by surveyor Mr. M'Carthy to the Superintendent of Public Works Department, Kuala Lumpur, Mr. H. F. Bellamy, when proposing a continuation of an existing road to connect to the upstream mines. Meanwhile, coffee plantations were being opened on a large scale in the same area, since the 1880s. However up until early 20th century, mining activities continued in the Gonggang area, and along Sungai Klang at the south and east side of Bukit Dinding.

1888 (October): Opening of Hawthornden Estate 

In October 1888, an estate in "Ulu Gonggang", located at Batu 5 Jalan Pahang Kuala Lumpur (north of Gonggang mining areas) was opened by J. A. Toynbee, late manager of Weld's Hill Estate under Messrs. Hill and Rathborne. It is possible that this estate expanded to Batu 6 Jalan Pahang, and named "Hawthornden Estate". It later expanded further to the east/southeast, until eventually covering most of Bukit Dinding.

1965 (September): Development of Part of Hawthornden Estate 

In 3rd September 1965, the federal government announced plans for a new township in Wardieburn Estate, which includes a small part of Hawthornden Estate. This was most likely in Taman Bunga Raya area today. It was the earliest development in these areas, which did not expand further inland towards Bukit Dinding until the 1980s.

1983: Hawthornden Estate New Township 

In 1983, four rubber plantations went through compulsory government acquisition under the then-young Prime Minister, Tun Mahathir. The land acquisition was exercised to tackle the urbanization problem of that era – squatters and insufficient housing for migration of people from the rural area to Kuala Lumpur:
 Ladang Hawthornden
 Ladang Gonggang
 Ladang Kent 
 Ladang Wardieburn. 

All four plantations were then reclassified and rezoned as "residential lands" - these parcels of lands are then sold to developers. 

The vast plantation area - then converted to suburbs - was named Wangsa Maju, the shortened version of Titiwangsa Maju.

One of the plantations – Hawthornden Rubber Estate Company, owned by famous Loke Yew – included plots of lands of the BUKIT DINDING we know today.  All of the estates were rezoned as residential, including this plots of land on the hill.

On 9th December 1983, the Master Plan for a new township covering most of Hawthornden Estate, known as "Projek Pusat Pertumbuhan Bandar Baru Ladang Hawthornden", was approved. Since then, development started in the area later known as Wangsa Maju, starting with Section 1 (low-cost aparments), followed by Sections 2, 3, and 4 (mid-range apartments), and Section 5 (terrace houses, apartments, and condominiums). In that plan, part of Bukit Dinding (marked as "R-12") was already gazetted as "Residential Area". However it was not developed and remained as a forested part of the hill until today.

The incidents of notorious landslides of Highland Tower (1993) and Bukit Antarabangsa (2008) had halted slope developments throughout the country. Nevertheless, it is remained unknown why the land plots zoning for slopes of Bukit Dinding (and many other hills in the country) was never rezoned until today.

1983-1995: From Gonggang Estate to Setiawangsa 

On 22th September 1981, a Penang-based developer company, Island & Peninsular (I&P) Group Sdn Bhd took over the ownership of Gonggang Estate. By May 1983, the company's proposed layout plan for the 102-hectare Gonggang Estate site was approved. The scheme comprised well over 6,000 residential units, about 150 shophouses as well as a modern shopping and commercial centre. Building work and house sales by progress payments were planned for the end of the year 1983. Throughout the years 1983-1995, Gonggang Estate, including the foothill and mid-hill areas in the west and south-west side of Bukit Dinding, were developed in stages, and later known as "Taman Setiawangsa". The final phase of the development was the highest part of the area, named "Puncak Setiawangsa", which was completed in 1995.

Development Plans for Bukit Dinding

2008 (15th May): Draft of Kuala Lumpur City Plan 2020 (KLCP 2020) 

Dewan Bandaraya Kuala Lumpur (DBKL) displayed the Draft of Kuala Lumpur City Plan 2020 (KLCP 2020). In the proposed "Environmental Protection Zone" and "Zoning" maps in that draft, most of Bukit Dinding was already planned for residential developments.

2012 (28th December): Puncak Setiawangsa Landslide 

On Friday, 28th December 2012, around 10pm, a landslide occurred in Puncak Setiawangsa, the south-west tip of Bukit Dinding. It involved failure of an engineered wall built on a 43-metre high slope in 1989-1991. The catastrophic slope failure was triggered by a rainfall that occurred 2 days prior. In the aftermath of the landslide, a residential house located at the top edge of the slope partly collapsed, and one carriageway of the dual carriageway at the bottom of the slope was closed.

The houses and shop lots at the bottom of the slope were unaffected, but inhabitants of 46 of those houses were temporarily relocated for safety concerns.

2014 (September): Development on East Bukit Dinding 

The first development project on the eastern side of Bukit Dinding was started by Kerjaya Prospek Property Sdn Bhd around September 2014. Amid opposition from the local residents, the project pressed on and was soft-launched on 12th August 2017, before finally completing in 2020. The aftermath was ongoing flooding from rain and bad drainage system, damaging homes and cars, and wild animals from the hill (especially snakes) escaping into lower homes in affected areas. The affected residents were Kelumpuk Serindit, Keramat AU, and its surroundings.

2017 (12th May): Fissures in Puncak Setiawangsa 

The cliff along Jalan 11/55C, Puncak Setiawangsa, Bukit Setiawangsa (the exact same location of the 2012 landslide) appeared to have fissures measuring half-a-metre.

2017 (July): EIA Approval for Projek Wangsa Maju 

The Department of Environment approved the Environmental Impact Assessment, EIA Report for "Projek Wangsa Maju", proposed by Nova Pesona Sdn. Bhd., the company which planned to develop a large portion of the west side of Bukit Dinding, marked as "R-12" in Bandar Baru Ladang Hawthornden Master Plan of 1983. The report identifies Bukit Dinding as a sensitive area, and even though the forest and wildlife within were considered "sparse", the project would still cause wildlife encounters particularly among residents in the east side of Bukit Dinding, and would require assistance from Perhilitan to relocate the wildlife to forests such as Ampang Forest Reserve located further to the east.

2018 (30th October): Gazettement of KLCP 2020 

Kuala Lumpur City Plan 2020 (KLCP 2020) was finally gazetted on 30th October 2018. However, some of the contents were changed from the previous 2008 draft, without proper engagements with the public. As proposed in the 2008 draft, most of Bukit Dinding was planned for residential development. However, the remaining 70-acre portion of Bukit Dinding previously marked as "Public Open Space" was reduced to 50 acres, and labeled as "Taman Rekreasi Bukit Dinding" in the "Hierarchy Public Parks and Open Space" and "Zoning" maps.

2020 (18th February): Draft of Kuala Lumpur Structure Plan 2040 (PSKL 2040) 

In Draft of Kuala Lumpur Structure Plan 2040 (PSKL 2040), the borders of the remaining Bukit Dinding remains  unchanged, and labelled as "Neighborhood Park".

Threat: Slope, Hillside and Hill Land Development 

A map titled "Pelan Kawasan Bukit Dinding" by Jabatan Perancangan Bandaraya DBKL went viral on the internet in 2022. It suddenly came to public knowledge that almost all the land areas on the hill are owned by five respective developers, a total of over 225 acres. In reality, these land parcels have always been zoned as residential since 1983. The general public had mistakenly assumed that the development projects would not proceed considering landslides incidents at nearby Highland Tower and Bukit Antarabangsa.

Government authorities had approved development of high-rise condominiums and a new township on Bukit Dinding, despite its Environmental Protection Zone (EPZ) status in Kuala Lumpur City Plan 2020. Bukit Dinding is a significant miss-out from the Urban Forest category. Tagged as 'Taman Rekreasi Bukit Dinding' through draft stages of KLCP2020, it is now reduced from 70 acres (KLSP2020 depiction) to 50 acres (KLCP2020 & draft KLSP2040 depiction). Meanwhile reality on the ground is that DBKL has yet to create a public park there throughout the 2000–2020 period – it remains to this day as 'vacant land', with Telekom Malaysia being the only institutional presence on the hill. Despite this lack of attention by DBKL, it has attracted a community of regular users, which grew significantly during the COVID-19 RMCO period.

Opposed Developments of New Residentials 

On 28th March 2022, Director of the City Development Department, Zulkurnain Hassan, approved the proposal to build 2 blocks of 26-storey condominiums by Nova Pesona Sdn Bhd, as a continuation to the previous plans, supported by the 2017 EIA report. The local residents were not informed of these, and when knowledge of it came to light, they protested the proposed development, stating the EIA has past its validity period and was not done holistically, such as insufficient slope analysis, landslide risk assessments, and other issues.

On 15 September 2022, a meeting Sesi Komunikasi Strategi Sebelum Pembinaan was called by the developer Nova Pesona Sdn Bhd, attended by 125 persons mostly residents of homes around Bukit Dinding. The developer revealed that DBKL had issued them the Development order dated 28 March 2022, with timelines of earthworks to commence at Q4 2022. The residents had openly opposed to the development stating various concerns, mostly on risks of landslide, flood and traffic concerns.

On 22 September 2022, DBKL has warned developer Nova Pesona against starting work on Bukit Dinding despite of their Development Order, until discussion with residents finalised. DBKL reiterated that no work should be carried out until residents were fully-informed about the development, which had seen huge opposition from residents in the area over safety concerns.

Between 15 and 17 October 2022, four resident associations have lodged police report against the Developer Nova Pesona Sdn Bhd. feeling threatened by the purported development.

On 16 November 2022, during the Townhall event by Friends of Bukit Dinding, five out six election candidates for P118 Setiawangsa showed up, which included incumbent MP Nik Nazmi Nik Ahmad (Pakatan Harapan), Nurul Fadzilah Kamaluddin (Perikatan Nasional) and Bibi Sunita Sakandar Khan (Pejuang) have signed the pledge to protect Bukit Dinding.

List of Developers / Land Owners of Plots on Bukit Dinding

1. Developer: Kerjaya Prospek Property Sdn Bhd 
 Direction: East of Bukit Dinding
 Affected Residents: Kelumpuk Serindit, Keramat AU and surrounding
 Status: Kaleidoscope Condominium -  completed in year 2020
 Description: In year 2014, the affected residents had actively protested and objected against the development - but to no avail. 
 Aftermath: Ongoing flooding from rain and bad drainage system. Flood water damaged homes and cars. Wild animals from the hill (especially snakes) escaping into lower homes in affected areas.

2. Developer: Nova Pesona Sdn Bhd  
 Direction: North West Bukit Dinding
 Land Area: 130 acres
 To be Affected Residents: Seksyen 5 Wangsa Maju, Fairview International School, Sri Kenangan Condominium and surrounding
 Status: DBKL Development Order (D.O.) has been obtained on 28 March 2022 - facing strong protests from residents and other stakeholders.

3. Developer: Harmony Properties Sdn Bhd 
 Direction: East of Bukit Dinding
 Land Area: 33 acres
 To be Affected Residents:  vs Kelumpuk Kenari A, Kelumpuk Kuang C, part of Keramat AU towards Hulu Kelang
 Status: Unknown

4. Developer: Paragrene Land Berhad 
 Direction: South Bukit Dinding 
 Land Area: 56 acres 
 To be Affected Residents: Bukit Wangsamas, Taman Setiawangsa and surrounding
 Status: Unknown.

5. Developer: MCL Properties Sdn Bhd 
 Direction: North West Bukit Dinding
 Land Area: 5 acres
 To be Affected Residents: Bukit Wangsamas, Taman Setiawangsa and surrounding
 Status: Unknown

References 

Geography of Kuala Lumpur
Nature sites of Malaysia